The 2000–01 season was the 94th season in the existence of Real Betis and the club's first season back in the second division of Spanish football since 1994.

Transfers

In 
 David Belenguer Reverter from Extremadura
 Jesús Capitán Prada from Granada
 Francisco Javier Castaño Allende from Numancia
 Gabriel Amato from Rangers
 Joaquín from Real Betis B
 Gastón Casas
 José Fábio Alves de Azevedo
 Arturo García Muñoz from Real Betis B
 Víctor Manuel Torres Mestre from Alavés
 César de Loma Atienza from Mérida
 Michel Pavon from Bordeaux

Competitions

Overall record

Segunda División

League table

Results summary

Results by round

Matches

Copa del Rey

Statistics

Goalscorers

References

Real Betis seasons
Real Betis